The following page lists all power stations in France.

Geothermal

Nuclear

Thermal

Hydroelectric

See also 

 List of power stations in Europe
 List of largest power stations in the world

References 

France
Power stations